Pusnâ is one of the most important festivals celebrated by the Hajong people on or around January 14. In 2016, the festival falls on January 15. Pusnâ is a solar event making one of the few  traditional Hajong festivals which fall on the same date in the Gregorian calendar every year, that is January 14, with some exceptions when the festival is celebrated on January 13 or 15. It is the celebration of Sankranthi, with feasts lasting for a week. Traditionally, Pusnâ is also a time for the family to get together. One activity that occurs during these get-togethers is the making and eating of  Pi-thâ. Pi-thâs are made of glutinous rice flour.

Traditional customs
During pusnâ people prepare different kinds of traditional cakes with ground rice, scraped coconut, banana and juice extracted from Palmyra palm. Some of these rice cakes are deep fried, and some are steamed in bamboo or banana leaves. Ancestors are honoured on the first day of Pusnâ. People visit their relatives and friends during this festival.

See also
Hajong ethnic religion
Hajong people

References

Hajong culture
Culture of Meghalaya
Harvest festivals in India
Folk festivals in India
Spring festivals
Religious festivals in India